Savage Season is a 1990 crime novel by American author Joe R. Lansdale.  It is the first in a series of books and stories written by Lansdale featuring the characters Hap Collins and Leonard Pine.  The novel was nominated for a Bram Stoker Award for Best (Mystery) Novel of 1990.

Plot synopsis

Hap and Leonard are two Texan men who are down on their luck, both working low paying jobs well into their 40s.  Hap's ex-wife Trudy returns, involving the pair in a scheme to retrieve hundreds of thousands of dollars stolen from a bank and then lost in a creek in the woods in an area which Hap knows quite well.  She is involved with a small group of radical leftists who wish to use the money to fund their movement; Hap and Leonard just wish to have enough to retire somewhere pleasant.  Her return, as well as her continued involvement with various movements, awakens dormant emotions in Hap, leading him to wonder whether he should have devoted more time to the ideals he felt in the 1960s, and whether he had wasted his time in the interim on low-paying, go nowhere jobs.  Once Hap finds the money, the leftists reveal the violent nature of their plans, and kidnap Hap and Leonard rather than pay them.  The leftists are quickly betrayed when they attempt to buy guns from a local drug dealer named Soldier, which leads to a violent confrontation over the stolen money.  In the end, Hap is left with conflicted emotions about the 1960s and his own part in them, regretting neither his former idealism nor his current cynicism.

Characters
 Hap Collins narrates the novel.  He is exactly 40 years of age in this story (shown by twice contrasting Trudy's age with his own, and stated to be four years younger than him), and going through something of a mid-life crisis, wondering how to improve his life, when the former love of his life returns and reminds him of how he used to be.  In his early 20s, when he was involved with her, Hap deliberately got drafted so that he could refuse to go and martyr himself for the cause.  This led to him spending 18 months in jail and losing his relationship with Trudy.  Over time, he grew more cynical about whether such movements could ever accomplish anything positive, though he continues to feel strongly for Trudy, taking her back every time she returns, and crying every time she leaves.  Despite seeming to be a typical "redneck", Hap displays progressive stances on race, gender, and sexual orientation.  He generally tries to remain non-violent as long as possible, but is quite adept at physical confrontation.

 Leonard Pine is Hap's best friend, a gay black man from Texas (later novels explicitly reveal that he is a Republican, which is only hinted at in this novel).  His backstory is not touched upon in Savage Season, except to explain that he was a veteran of the Vietnam War.  Later novels explain that he was raised alternately by his grandmother (who taught him various social values) and his uncle (who taught him how to fight and "be a man", and later rejected him for revealing his homosexuality).  Leonard has few friends other than Hap because of his violent temper, preferring the company of his many dogs.
 Trudy Fawst is Hap's one-time love.  She believes in numerous ideals from the 1960s, and frequently attracts men sexually only to recruit them for whatever her latest cause is.  Though she shows no scruples regarding her dealings with men, she does passionately believe in the various causes, even being willing to be crucified against a table rather than handing the money over to Soldier.
 Howard is Trudy's current lover who, while in prison, found out about the money which was lost following a bank heist.
 Chub is a member of their group; though he is consistently mocked throughout the book for being overweight, for being a trust-fund baby who joined the group out of boredom, and for his dedication to psychoanalysis, many characters re-think him following what they view as a noble death.
 Paco is another member of their group, later revealed to be Gabriel Lane, a former leader of an extremely radical group of anarchists who was disfigured in an accidental explosion and passed off among various underground leftists groups to care for.
 Soldier and Angel are the criminals whom the group attempts to buy guns from.  Angel is a female bodybuilder, and Soldier's lover. Though Soldier is the leader, Angel is consistently both smarter and stronger than he is.

External links
Author's Official Website
Paperback Publisher's website

References

Novels by Joe R. Lansdale
American mystery novels
1990 American novels
Novels set in Texas
Works by Joe R. Lansdale